Anita Devgan is an Indian film and television actress, who is known for her work in the Punjabi film industry. Her most well-known works are the films Jatt & Juliet, Ronde Sare Vyah Picho, Angrej, Bambukat, Rabb Da Radio, Golak Bugni Bank Te Batua, Mr. & Mrs. 420 Returns, Puaada, and Ni Main Sass Kuttni.

Early life and education 
Anita grew up in Amritsar, Punjab, India. She done her schooling and college from Government Middle School, Chicha, Amritsar and Khalsa College for Women, Amritsar Punjab University, Patiala, India. After completion of her college study she azquired her Bachelor of Arts (B.A.) Master in Arts (M.A.) from Punjab University, Patiala, India.

Career 
Anita is a theatre performer from Punjab who works in the Punjabi film industry. She began acting through a TV program on DD Punjabi called "Hakim Tara Chand". Hashar (2008), a love story was her first Punjabi film, and she has since appeared in more than 40 films in supporting roles. Additionally, she received the Virasat International Punjabi Film Award and the Best Supporting Actress PTC Punjabi Film Award.

Her most famous films include Jatt & Juliet (2012, 2013), R.S.V.P., Angrej (2015), Bambukat (2016), Rabb Da Radio (2017, 2019), Golak Bugni Bank Te Batua (2018), Mr. & Mrs. 420 Returns (2018), Puaada (2021), and Ni Main Sass Kuttni (2022). In the film Ni Main Sass Kuttni, she appeared with actors Nirmal Rishi, Gurpreet Ghuggi, Karamjit Anmol, and Mehtab Virk in a lead role.

Filmography 

 Hashar A Love Story (2008)as Chachi
 Panjaban-Love Rules Hearts (2010) as Gugni's mother
 Jatt & Juliet (2012) as 
 Jatt & Juliet 2 (2013) as Fateh's mom
 Fer Mamla Gadbad Gadbad (2013) as Timmy's Mother
 Ronde Sare Vyah Picho (2013) as 
 Mundeyan Ton Bachke Rahin (2014) as Prince's mother
 Proper Patola (2014) as Mad Lady
 Angrej (2015) as 
 Judge Singh LLB (2015) as Sonu's Mother
 Kaptaan (2016) as 
 Bambukat (2016) as Channan's mother
 Judaiyaan (2017) as 
 Thug Life (2017) as MLA's Mother
 Nikka Zaildar 2 (2017) as Saawan's mother
 Punjab Singh (2018) as 
 Golak Bugni Bank Te Batua (2018) as Usha
 Jatt vs. Ielts (2018) as 
 Jagga Jiunda E (2018) as 
 Yamla Pagla Deewana Phir Se (2018) as Sati
 Kurmaiyan (2018) as 
 Laatu (2018) as Jailo
 Marriage Palace (2018) as Nimma's Bhua
 Kala Shah Kala (2019) as Satwant Kaur
 Shadaa (2019) as Chadta's mother
 Singham (2019) as 
 Jaddi Sardar (2019) as Mindo
 Tara Mira (2019) as Mira's Bua
 Kitty Party (2019) as 
 Jinde Meriye (2020) as Surjeet Kaur
 Puaada (2021) as Jaggi's mother
 Teeja Punjab (2021) as Sarpanch's wife
 Jatt Brothers (2022) as 
 Umran Ch Ki Rakheya (2022) as Kanwal's friend
 Ni Main Sass Kuttni (2022) as 
 Mahi Mera Nikka Jeha (2022) as Guddu - Noor's Mother
 Sass Meri Ne Munda Jamya (2022) as 
 Rabba Rabba Meeh Varsa I (2022) as 
 Rabba Rabba Meeh Varsa II (2022) as 
 Kali Jotta (2023) as 
 Tu Hovein Main Hovan (2023) as Kelly's Mother
 Ji Wife Ji (2023) as

Awards

References 

Actresses from Punjab, India
Living people
Punjabi people
Indian film actresses
Indian television actresses
20th-century Indian actresses
21st-century Indian actresses
Year of birth missing (living people)